Knockout Kings 2002 is a boxing video game by EA Sports, released on March 4, 2002, on PlayStation 2 and Xbox. It features Muhammad Ali on the front cover. It also features many well-known boxers like Lennox Lewis, Félix Trinidad, Oscar De La Hoya,  Evander Holyfield, Butterbean, Vitali and Wladimir Klitschko, and Bernard Hopkins.

Gameplay 
Knockout Kings 2002 features a different engine than its predecessors, as it now features smoother graphics and a new control scheme, which allows boxers to move around the ring much fluidly, as well as a new analog evasion system, where tilting the left analog stick slightly allows a boxer to bob or weave in the direction of the stick's movement.

Like its predecessors, Knockout Kings 2002 features a career mode, where players create a boxer and partake in a series of fights to become champion. For the first time, players can use a real boxer in the mode. The game also features a tournament mode.

Unlike Knockout Kings 2001 before it, the game forgoes female boxers, instead featuring some fictional boxers including, but not limited to, Henri Tibualt, Joe Giere, Kazahiro Arikawa, Tyler Brooks, Pete Donohue, and Lawrence O'Toole. These boxers would later be featured in the GameCube-exclusive Knockout Kings 2003.

Reviews
Metacritic gave the game a score of 76/100 on PS2 and 78/100 on Xbox.

References

PlayStation 2 games
Xbox games
2002 video games
Video games set in 2002
EA Sports games
Boxing video games
Video games developed in the United States
Video games scored by Burke Trieschmann
Black Ops Entertainment games
Multiplayer and single-player video games